Askevatnet is a lake in the municipality of Askøy in Vestland county, Norway.  The  lake lies just northeast of the village of Ask on the eastern side of the island of Askøy.  The lake is regulated by a small dam on the southeastern part of the lake.

See also
List of lakes in Norway

References

Lakes of Vestland
Askøy
Reservoirs in Norway